Ammara Butt is a Pakistani television actress. She is known for her role as Komal in Ranjha Ranjha Kardi (2018). She made her debut as a lead actress in A-Plus TV's Hoor Pari (2019). Her other appearances include Meherbaan (2017), De Ijazat (2018), Aakhri Station (2018) and Ajnabi Lage Zindagi (2019).

Television

References 

21st-century Pakistani actresses
1998 births
Living people
Pakistani television actresses
Actresses from Lahore
Lahore College for Women University alumni